Matthew Parr (born 1 March 1990) is an English former competitive figure skater. He is a four-time British national champion (2009–10, 2013–14).

Career
Parr began competing on the ISU Junior Grand Prix series in 2004. He made his senior international debut at the 2008 Golden Spin of Zagreb.

Following the 2009 European Championships, Parr was named as the British entry for the 2009 World Championships, replacing Elliot Hilton, but Hilton won a lawsuit against the National Ice Skating Association and was restored to the team.

Parr competed at the 2009 World Junior Championships in Sofia, the 2010 European Championships in Tallinn, and 2010 World Championships in Turin. The Nebelhorn Trophy in September 2013 was the final qualification opportunity for countries which had not yet earned spots in individual Olympic figure skating events. Placing 25th, Parr was unsuccessful in his bid for an individual berth - missing out by one place. In January 2014, he placed 27th at the 2014 European Championships in Budapest.

Parr was selected to compete at the 2014 Winter Olympics, held in February in Sochi, Russia, due to the United Kingdom's qualification for the team figure skating event. On the first day of the Olympics, he placed ninth out of ten skaters in the men's short program, earning two points for the UK. His country did not advance further.

Parr retired from competition following the Olympic Games in February 2014.

Programs

Competitive highlights

References

External links
 

1990 births
20th-century English people
21st-century English people
British male single skaters
English male single skaters
Living people
Sportspeople from North Shields
Sportspeople from Newcastle upon Tyne
Figure skaters at the 2014 Winter Olympics
Olympic figure skaters of Great Britain